Paul Joseph Frick is an American psychologist and the Roy Crumpler Memorial Chair in psychology at Louisiana State University (LSU), as well as a professor at the Learning Sciences Institute of Australia at Australian Catholic University. He is known for his research on psychopathy and antisocial behavior in children, which he has been studying for over twenty years.

Biography
Frick was educated at Louisiana State University and the University of Georgia. While still training to become a family therapist, he changed his mind after deciding that treatments for child aggression were not effective enough, so instead he chose to study the causes of such behavior. Before joining the faculty of LSU in 2015, he was a University Distinguished Professor of psychology at the University of New Orleans, where he was chair of the psychology department from 2007 to 2015. He was the president of the Society for the Scientific Study of Psychopathy from 2009 to 2011, and editor-in-chief of the Journal of Clinical Child & Adolescent Psychology from 2007 to 2011. Since 2018, he has been editor-in-chief of the Journal of Abnormal Child Psychology. In 2015, he received the Robert D. Hare Lifetime Achievement Award from the Society for the Scientific Study of Psychopathy.

References

External links
Faculty page

Academic journal editors
Louisiana State University faculty
Living people
Academic staff of the Australian Catholic University
Louisiana State University alumni
University of Georgia alumni
University of New Orleans faculty
Year of birth missing (living people)
American child psychologists